Physa megalochlamys is a species of gastropod belonging to the family Physidae.

The species inhabits freshwater environments.

References

Physidae